Oscar Ortigosa (born 29 January 1966) is a Peruvian breaststroke swimmer. He competed in two events at the 1984 Summer Olympics.

References

External links
 

1966 births
Living people
Peruvian male breaststroke swimmers
Olympic swimmers of Peru
Swimmers at the 1984 Summer Olympics
Place of birth missing (living people)